White Soul is the third album by Chicago pop band Green, released in 1989 on Megadisc Records in the Netherlands. It was then re-released in the United States in 1991 on Widely Distributed Records, along with a new EP, Bittersweet.

Track listing

Personnel
Green
Mark Mosher – drums
Ken Kurson – bass guitar, vocals
Jeff Lescher – guitar, vocals
Additional musicians and production
Iain Burgess – production
Green – production

References

External links 
 

1989 albums
Albums produced by Iain Burgess
Green (band) albums